Mars Hill is a town in Madison County, North Carolina, United States. The population was 1,869 at the 2010 U.S. Census, and was estimated at 2,032 in 2018 by the U.S. Census. It is the home of Mars Hill University, the name of which was inspired by Acts 17:22.  The town is located  due north of Asheville. Interstate 26 passes one mile east of the town. It is part of the Asheville Metropolitan Statistical Area.

History
Long occupied by indigenous peoples, this area was not settled by European Americans much before the American Revolutionary War. They were mostly yeomen and subsistence farmers, many of whom had Scots-Irish ethnicity. The California Creek Missionary Baptist Church, Mars Hill College Historic District, Mars Hill High School, and Thomas J. Murray House are listed on the National Register of Historic Places.

Geography
Mars Hill is located at  (35.828496, -82.547843).

Higher education
Mars Hill University, a private, coed, liberal-arts college, is located in Mars Hill. Founded in 1856 by local Baptists, it is the oldest college or university in western North Carolina. Although it is no longer directly associated with a Baptist church or organization, the university does state that "it is an academic community rooted in the Christian faith." Due to the presence of the university, residents of the town of Mars Hill enjoy a much greater variety of cultural, intellectual, and entertainment offerings than would usually be found in a town of its size. The university's enrollment typically runs from 1300 to 1600 students; they are not included in the census calculations of the town's population.

Demographics

2020 census

As of the 2020 United States census, there were 2,007 people, 742 households, and 440 families residing in the town.

2000 census
As of the census of 2000, there were 1,764 people, 541 households, and 312 families residing in the town. The population density was 911.7 people per square mile (352.9/km2). There were 586 housing units at an average density of 302.9 per square mile (117.2/km2). The racial makeup of the town was 91.21% White, 5.95% African American, 0.28% Native American, 0.85% Asian, 0.85% from other races, and 0.85% from two or more races. Hispanic or Latino of any race were 1.36% of the population.

There were 541 households, out of which 20.5% had children under the age of 18 living with them, 45.1% were married couples living together, 11.1% had a female householder with no husband present, and 42.3% were non-families. 33.1% of all households were made up of individuals, and 17.4% had someone living alone who was 65 years of age or older. The average household size was 2.10 and the average family size was 2.68.

In the town, the population was spread out, with 11.7% under the age of 18, 43.1% from 18 to 24, 16.2% from 25 to 44, 15.7% from 45 to 64, and 13.3% who were 65 years of age or older. The median age was 23 years. For every 100 females, there were 89.1 males. For every 100 females age 18 and over, there were 86.7 males.

The median income for a household in the town was $32,917, and the median income for a family was $45,000. Males had a median income of $29,615 versus $23,625 for females. The per capita income for the town was $13,366. About 11.1% of families and 16.9% of the population were below the poverty line, including 21.1% of those under age 18 and 14.9% of those age 64 or over.

Notable people
 John Chandler, educator
 Tommy Hunter, fiddler
 Bascom Lamar Lunsford, folklorist and performer of traditional folk and country music from Western North Carolina
 Graham Martin, former United States Ambassador to South Vietnam
 Ray Rapp, former member of the North Carolina General Assembly

References

External links
 Official website

Towns in Madison County, North Carolina
Towns in North Carolina
Asheville metropolitan area